A romer is a cartographic measuring tool.

Romer, Römer, Roemer, or similar may also refer to:

People
 Romer (surname)

Other uses 
 Römer, a medieval building in Frankfurt am Main
 Römer (crater), a lunar crater
 Romer arm, an industrial measuring device
 Romer v. Evans, a United States Supreme Court case dealing with civil rights and state laws
 Rømer scale, a disused temperature scale
 Romer's gap in the record of vertebrate fossils c. 360–340 million years ago
 Romer Shoal Light, a lighthouse off the coast of New Jersey, United States
 rummers or roemers, drinking glasses

See also 
 Roamer (disambiguation)
 Rohmer, surname
 Rummer